Bob's-Cola was a beverage company and bottler that sold beverages in the Midwestern United States and Southeastern United States. It was founded in Atlanta in 1940 by Benjamin J. Frink.

Name and flavors
There was no Bob at Bob's-Cola. The founder chose the name because "it was a good name, an easy name to remember." 

The company bottled a variety of flavors, including Bob's-Cola, Swanee, Bubble-Up, and Jo-Jo chocolate drink.

Growth and decline

Throughout the 1940s, Bob's-Cola evolved from a storefront soda shop to a major regional bottler. On May 17, 1947 Bob's-Cola opened a "state-of-the-art" $250,000 bottling plant at 865 Lee Street in Atlanta, Georgia - not far from the original soda shop. The bottling plant included both production and distribution and such amenities as a kitchen and rooftop garden.

In 1951, founder B.J. Frink died, and the cola company did not survive long after his death. By 1955 the company was sold; the Atlanta bottling plant was later demolished to make way for a mass transit station.

References

1940 establishments in Georgia (U.S. state)
1955 disestablishments in Georgia (U.S. state)
American cola brands
American companies established in 1940
Defunct brands
Food and drink companies disestablished in 1955
Food and drink companies established in 1940